Van Buren is a village in Hancock County, Ohio, United States. The population was 328 at the 2010 census.

History
Van Buren was laid out in 1833, and named for Martin Van Buren, then incumbent Vice President (1833–1837) and afterward President of the United States (1837–1841). The village was incorporated in 1866.

The first schoolhouse in Allen Township was a small log structure built in 1836. It was built of round logs covered with a clapboard roof, had greased paper windows and a huge fireplace at one end. About 1870 a two-room brick building was built on East Market Street. This building was later condemned and a four-room school was erected and used till 1917 when the schools of Allen Township were centralized and the present school, Van Buren High School, was erected.

A post office called Van Buren has been in operation since 1835.

Geography
Van Buren is located at  (41.138229, -83.649122).

Demographics

2010 census
As of the census of 2010, there were 328 people, 119 households, and 98 families living in the village. The racial makeup of the village was 97.3% White, 1.8% from other races, and 0.9% from two or more races. Hispanic or Latino of any race were 4.3% of the population.

There were 119 households, of which 41.2% had children under the age of 18 living with them, 64.7% were married couples living together, 10.9% had a female householder with no husband present, 6.7% had a male householder with no wife present, and 17.6% were non-families. 14.3% of all households were made up of individuals, and 4.2% had someone living alone who was 65 years of age or older. The average household size was 2.76 and the average family size was 3.01.

The median age in the village was 34.5 years. 30.5% of residents were under the age of 18; 4.5% were between the ages of 18 and 24; 28.3% were from 25 to 44; 23.8% were from 45 to 64; and 12.8% were 65 years of age or older. The gender makeup of the village was 49.7% male and 50.3% female.

2000 census
As of the census of 2000, there were 313 people, 113 households, and 91 families living in the village. The population density was 1,257.5 people per square mile (483.4/km). There were 116 housing units at an average density of 466.0 per square mile (179.2/km). The racial makeup of the village was 97.12% White, 0.32% African American, 0.96% from other races, and 1.60% from two or more races. Hispanic or Latino of any race were 4.15% of the population.

There were 113 households, out of which 43.4% had children under the age of 18 living with them, 69.0% were married couples living together, 6.2% had a female householder with no husband present, and 18.6% were non-families. 16.8% of all households were made up of individuals, and 8.0% had someone living alone who was 65 years of age or older. The average household size was 2.77 and the average family size was 3.12.

In the village, the population was spread out, with 29.1% under the age of 18, 5.8% from 18 to 24, 30.0% from 25 to 44, 25.9% from 45 to 64, and 9.3% who were 65 years of age or older. The median age was 36 years. For every 100 females there were 93.2 males. For every 100 females age 18 and over, there were 93.0 males.

The median income for a household in the village was $48,750, and the median income for a family was $55,625. Males had a median income of $42,188 versus $26,250 for females. The per capita income for the village was $20,061. About 1.1% of families and 1.7% of the population were below the poverty line, including none of those under the age of eighteen or sixty-five or over.

See also
 Van Buren State Park
 Van Buren High School

References

Villages in Hancock County, Ohio
Villages in Ohio